Hadi Prabowo, better known by his initials HP (born 3 April 1960) is an Indonesian politician and government employee, who is serving as the current Chancellor of the Institute for Home Affairs since 2020. Previously, he served as Secretary General of the Ministry of Home Affairs. In the 2013 Central Java gubernatorial election, Hadi ran as a candidate for governor who was promoted by a coalition of parties including the PKS, Gerindra, PKB, PPP, Hanura, and PKNU, and was paired with Don Murdono, the regent of Sumedang. However he lost the election, coming in third, behind Ganjar Pranowo and the then incumbent governor Bibit Waluyo.

References 

1960 births
Living people